Hengxiang Cycling Team is a Chinese UCI Continental cycling team, founded in 2011.

Team roster

Major wins

2013
Stage 3 Tour de Langkawi, Wang Meiyin
2014
 National Road Race Championships, Jingbiao Zhao
2015
Stage 2 Tour of Thailand, Ma Guangtong
2016
Stage 3 Tour de Flores, Ronald Yeung
Stage 4 Tour de Flores, Jianpeng Liu
Prologue Tour of China II, Thomas Rabou
Stage 3 Tour of Fuzhou, Jingbiao Zhao
2018
Stage 1 Tour of Fuzhou, Lü Xianjing
2019
Stage 3 Tour de Iskandar Johor, Wang Junyong
Mountains classification Tour of China I, Zhang Zheng
Overall Tour of China II, Lü Xianjing
Stage 3 Tour of Quanzhou Bay, Lü Xianjing
Mountains classification Tour of Quanzhou Bay, Lü Xianjing
2020
 National Road Race Championships, Wang Meiyin

References

External links

Hengxiang Cycling Team's Team List in Cycling Fever

UCI Continental Teams (Asia)
Cycling teams based in China
Cycling teams established in 2011